Milarite is a rare beryl. It is a member of the osumilite group. Crystals of this mineral typically come in green or yellow. The mineral gets name after Val Milar.

Occurrence 
The mineral can be found be found in countries like Switzerland, Brazil, Mexico, China, Namibia, and the United States.

It can be found in Alpine fissures. the mineral also occurs in marble xenoliths.

References 

Beryllium minerals